Maratus jactatus (colloquially named sparklemuffin) is a species of the genus Maratus (peacock spiders), an Australian member of the jumping spider family. Maratus jactatus are from the jumping spider group Salticidae. The name jactatus is Latin for rocking - derived from their signature mating rituals. Maratus jactatus have the ability to jump lengths up to 50 times their size. They have been collected only in Wondul Range National Park in southern Queensland. The sparklemuffin are very small spiders that range from being four to six millimeters in length, similar to the length of a grain of rice. The males are close to four and one half millimeters long, which is smaller compared to the female who are about five and three tenths millimeters long.

Body structure and attributes 
The female has a cryptically colored back, whereas the male has a colorful back. Males have vibrant and unique color patterns, similar to Maratus digitatus and Maratus calcitrans. Maratus jactatus males are set apart from these other species by their opisthosomal flap that extends to cover the opisthosomal plate. They also spread the flaps from over their inflated opisthomal plate, revealing unique iridescent blue scales "interrupted by three bold transverse bands of red-orange to orange pigmented scales."

Behavior

Courtship 
Like other Maratus spiders, the males of the species engage in a courtship display, during which they extend their median and posterior fringed spinnerets. A male presents both the extended spinnerets and his expanded and inflated opisthoma as he faces the female that he courts. Females will usually mate only once.

Maratus

Prey and predator relationships 
The spiders eat small insects like ants and sometimes other spiders. The females sometimes eat the male when they are trying to court them if they are not impressed. The Maratus spiders are preyed upon by bigger insects.

Role in ecosystem 
They eat small insects which ties in with their role in the ecosystem, controlling insect population. The control of the insects can then in turn help with agriculture seeing as there are not as many insects.

Nesting 
Females make their nest under ground and they stay to guard the eggs. The eggs then later hatch, but at different types depending on the sex of the spider.

References

Further reading

“Dancing Spiders.” Scholastic News -- Edition 5/6, vol. 83, no. 21, Apr. 2015, p. 3

Salticidae
Spiders of Australia
Spiders described in 2015